East Stoke is a village in the English county of Dorset. It lies three miles west of the small town of Wareham and two miles east of Wool. In 2013 the estimated population of the civil parish was 410.

The Freshwater Biological Association runs a research centre on the banks of the River Frome, from which the Game & Wildlife Conservation Trust runs its research into atlantic salmon declines.

References

External links 

 FBA East Stoke
 Game & Wildlife Conservation Trust research on the River Frome

Villages in Dorset